The Music Victoria Awards of 2014 are the ninth Annual Music Victoria Awards and consist of a series of awards, presented in October and November 2014.

The Genre awards were awarded on 16 October 2014 in The Age building, while the public voted, general awards were awarded in November on 170 Russell Street, Melbourne.

Hall of Fame inductees
 Daddy Cool and Ed Nimmervoll

Award nominees and winners

All genre Awards
Winners indicated in boldface, with other nominees in plain.

Genre Specific Awards

References

External links
 

2014 in Australian music
2014 music awards
Music Victoria Awards